The Tussock Fire was a wildfire that started near the town of Wickenburg, Arizona on May 8, 2021. The fire burned  and is 100% contained.

Development

May 
The Tussock Fire was first reported on May 8, 2021, at around 2pm MST. The fire is believed to be human-caused, but the specific cause is still under investigation.

Containment 
By May 24, 2021, the Tussock Fire reached 100% containment.

Aftermath

References 

Wildfires in Arizona
2021 Arizona wildfires
May 2021 events in the United States